The Sardinian regional election of 1949 took place on 8 May 1949. The Italian Constitution of 1948 granted a special autonomy to Sardinia.

After the election Luigi Crespellani, a Christian Democrat, formed a government with the Sardinian Action Party, a social-liberal regionalist party, that eventually quit the government in 1951.

Results

Sources: Regional Council of Sardinia and Istituto Cattaneo

References

Elections in Sardinia
1949 elections in Italy